Tetragonia is a genus of about 85 species of flowering plants in the family Aizoaceae, native to temperate and subtropical regions mostly of the Southern Hemisphere, in New Zealand, Australia, southern Africa and South America.

Description
Plants of the genus Tetragonia are herbs or small shrubs. Leaves are alternate and succulent, with flowers typically yellow and small in size. Flowers can be axillary, solitary or fasciculate, greenish or yellowish in colour and mostly bisexual. Fruit are initially succulent but become dry and woody with age. The genus name comes from "tetragonus", meaning "four-angled" and referring to the shape of the plants' fruits.

Distribution
About forty species of Tetragonia are found in southern Africa. They also occur in southern Australia.

Classification
The genus was first formally described by the botanist Carl Linnaeus in 1753 in the work Species Plantarum. Synonyms for the genus include Tetragonocarpos Mill., Demidovia Pall., and Tetragonella Miq.

Human use and cultivation
The best known species of Tetragonia is the leafy vegetable food crop, Tetragonia tetragonoides ("New Zealand spinach"). New Zealand spinach is widely cultivated as a summer leafy vegetable.

Some of the other species are also eaten locally, such as Tetragonia decumbens ("Dune spinach") which is a local delicacy in its native southern Africa.

Gallery

References

 
Aizoaceae genera
Taxa named by Carl Linnaeus